is an upscale residential district of Shibuya, Tokyo, Japan. Located on the southwestern part of Shibuya, this district borders Kamiyamachō on the north, Udagawachō on the east, Dōgenzaka on the southeast, Shinsenchō and Maruyamachō on the south, and Komaba on the west.

Places of interest

Cultural

Museums
 Shoto Museum of Art 
 Toguri Museum of Art

Theatre
 Nishino Ballet Troupe Head Office

Schools

 operates public elementary and junior high schools.
All of Shoto (1 and 2 chome) is zoned to Jinnan Elementary School (神南小学校), and Shoto Junior High School (松濤中学校).

Educational institutions in Shoto:
 Shoto Junior High School
 Yamazaki University of Animal Nursing Shibuya campus

Other
 Unification Movement Japan Headquarters
 Nabeshima Shoto Park
 Guest House of the Governor of Tokyo (now demolished)
 Former location of the Kanze Noh Theatre (now in Ginza)

Transportation
The nearest station is Shinsen Station, on the Keio Inokashira Line.

References

Neighborhoods of Tokyo
Shibuya